James Leroy Murrill (January 5, 1847 – April 26, 1937) is believed to be the last surviving Confederate veteran in Baltimore.

Early life
James Leroy Murrill was born on January 5, 1847, in Nelson County, Virginia. His father was a teacher, preacher, farmer, and a railroad boss. When James Leroy Murrill was 17, he enlisted in the Confederate States Army in 1863. He served in the 3rd Virginia Infantry Regiment (Company H); part of Kemper's/Terry's Virginia Brigade. He served in several major campaigns until Robert E. Lee's surrender at the Appomattox Court House which was only 17 miles from Murrill's home. 

After the war Murrill moved to Baltimore, Maryland, where he worked in his uncle's factory, The Murrill and Keizer Company, on 212 Holliday street next door to the Baltimore City Hall. He worked there as a mechanist, while he was going to the Maryland Institute for Mechanical Drawling.

When James Murrill graduated from The Maryland Institute of Mechanical Drawling, he was granted the Peabody Prize for his achievements while he was working his way up the ranks at the factory at the same time. He became an incredible mechanical drawler. Murrill taught at the institute for 4 years. Later, he became the school commissioner from 1887-1891.

Later life
James Murrill also became the President of Murrill and Keizer Company, which was a very profitable business for many years. It was very profitable so he  gave the company to his employees whom he had much respect for. Many of these employees had worked for the company for over 50 years. Murrill was the president of the Lafayette Perpetual Building and Loan Association for forty years until his death in 1937. He was also the president of the Baltimore Automatic Fire Alarm Company for many years. He was a member of the Masonic Order, and the Virginia Society. His wife, Fraces Wheeler, died in 1914. Murrill died in Baltimore, Maryland, on April 26, 1937, at the age of 91. He was survived by his son named Leroy Keizer Murrill (named after Louis Keizer from the Murrill and Keizer Company) and three grandchildren.

References

1847 births
1937 deaths
Confederate States Army soldiers